Savita Kovind (born 15 April 1952) is a former Indian government servant who served as the former First Lady of India from 2017 - 2022. She is the wife of the 14th President of India, Ram Nath Kovind. She was Chief Section Supervisor in Mahanagar Telephone Nigam Limited before retiring in 2005.

Early life 
Savita Kovind was born on 15 April 1952. Her parents originally lived near Lahore in present-day Pakistan and moved to India post-partition and settled in Lajpat Nagar in Delhi. She is a former employee in Mahanagar Telephone Nigam Limited (MTNL). She started her career in MTNL as a telephone operator. Gradually she got promoted to the post of Chief Section Supervisor. But in 2005, she took voluntary retirement.

Personal life 
Savita Devi married Ram Nath Kovind on 30 May 1974. They have two children, son Prashant Kumar Kovind and daughter Swati Kovind, as well as grandchildren. Her daughter Swati is a former air hostess employed in Air India.

First Lady of Bihar (2015–2017) 
Savita Devi served as the First Lady of Bihar from 16 August 2015 to 20 June 2017 during Ramnath Kovind's Governorship. First Lady of Bihar isn't an official post rather it is a role to be served. She was succeeded by her predecessor Sudha Tripathi after her husband's elevation to the Presidency assuming the role of First Lady of India.

First Lady of India (2017–2022)

Kovind assumed the role of First Lady of India on 25 July 2017 after nearly 2 years of vacancy since the former first lady died in office. India's first spouses act as the official hosts of  Rashtrapati Bhavan.

Social work 
During the COVID-19 pandemic in India, Kovind stitched face masks to be distributed at numerous shelter homes in New Delhi.

References

See also 
 Presidency of Ram Nath Kovind

|-

1952 births
Living people
First ladies and gentlemen of India